The West Side Waltz is a 1995 television film written and directed by Ernest Thompson and starring Shirley MacLaine, Liza Minnelli, Jennifer Grey and Kathy Bates. It is based on Thompson's play of the same name, which starred Katharine Hepburn and Dorothy Loudon on Broadway.

Cast
Shirley MacLaine as Margaret Mary Elderdice
Liza Minnelli as Cara Varnum
Jennifer Grey as Robin Ouiseau
August Schellenberg as Serge
Richard Gilliland
Hal Williams as Jonno
Ernest Thompson
Camille Saviola 
Estelle Harris 
Tsai Chin 
Mary Pat Gleason
Kathy Bates as Mr. Goo
Robert Pastorelli as Sookie Cerullo
George Alvarez as Construction Worker
Richard Reicheg as Mr. Lipson
Alfred C. Cerullo III as Roger
Danny Woodburn as Mechanic

References

External links
 
 

CBS network films
1990s English-language films
1995 films
Films scored by Patrick Williams
Television shows based on plays
1995 television films
Films directed by Ernest Thompson